The Burkinabé Women's Championship is the top flight of women's association football in Burkina Faso. The competition is run by the Burkinabé Football Federation.

History
The first Burkinabé women's championship was contested on 2002–03 season. It was won by Princesses FC du Kadiogo.

Champions
The list of champions and runners-up:

Most successful clubs

See also 
 Burkinabé Women's Cup

References

External links 
 Foot Féminin - fbfoot.com

 
Women's association football leagues in Africa
Football competitions in Burkina Faso
Women
2002 establishments in Burkina Faso
Sports leagues established in 2002